Distant Trumpet is a 1952 British drama film directed by Terence Fisher and starring Derek Bond and Jean Patterson. A Harley Street doctor answers the call to perform medical missionary work in Africa, taking over from his indisposed brother.

Cast
 Derek Bond as David Anthony
 Jean Patterson as Valerie Maitland
 Derek Elphinstone as Richard Anthony
 Anne Brooke as Beryl Jeffries
 Grace Gavin as Mrs. Phillips
 Jean Webster Brough as Mrs. Waterhouse
 Grace Denbeigh-Russell as Mrs Hallet
 Constance Fraser as Mrs Nettley	
 Alban Blakelock as Mr Harris	
 John Howlett as Bill Hepple
 Keith Pyott as Sir Rudolph Gettins	
 Peter Fontaine as Peter	
 Gwynne Whitby as Lady Marriot-Stokes	
 Anne Hunter as 'Simply Dressed Woman'

References

External links
 

1952 films
British drama films
1952 drama films
Films directed by Terence Fisher
British black-and-white films
1950s English-language films
1950s British films